Trent Kaese (born September 9, 1967) is a Canadian former professional ice hockey right wing. He was drafted in the eighth round, 161st overall, by the Buffalo Sabres in the 1985 NHL Entry Draft. He played one game in the National Hockey League with the Sabres during the 1988–89 season, on March 25, 1989 against the Quebec Nordiques. The rest of his career, which lasted from 1987 to 1995, was spent in various minor leagues and then by several seasons in the British Hockey League.

Career statistics

Regular season and playoffs

See also
 List of players who played only one game in the NHL

External links

1967 births
Living people
Blackburn Hawks players
Buffalo Sabres draft picks
Buffalo Sabres players
Calgary Wranglers (WHL) players
Canadian ice hockey right wingers
Columbus Chill players
Flint Spirits players
Ice hockey people from British Columbia
Lethbridge Broncos players
Milton Keynes Kings players
Peterborough Pirates players
Phoenix Roadrunners (IHL) players
Rochester Americans players
Sportspeople from Nanaimo
Swift Current Broncos players
Winston-Salem Thunderbirds players